The Poor Law Officers' Journal was a journal published in England and Wales which kept Poor Law officials up to date with changes in the laws relating to Poor Law administration.  The journal was set up in Rochdale, a large market town in Greater Manchester, and published from 1892 to 1929.  It changed its name to the Public Assistance Journal and Health & Hospital Review which became the Health Service Journal in 1986.

The Editors of the Journal produced a number of guidebooks:

References

British law journals
Defunct journals of the United Kingdom
English Poor Laws
Publications disestablished in 1929
Publications established in 1892
Magazines published in England
1892 establishments in England